Wingolf is an umbrella organisation of 35 student fraternities at 34 universities in Germany, Austria and Estonia. It has approximately 5,000 members. It is one of the oldest oecumenical organisations in Germany. It has a close friendship with the Falkensteinerbund in Switzerland.

It is a Christian fraternity, wears its own colours (black, white, gold), and was the first German Studentenverbindung not  to practise academic fencing.

Motto
The motto of all Wingolf fraternities is "Δι ένoς πάντα" - "Di henos panta" (Greek: all things through him (= Jesus Christ)). (Philippians 4, Verse 13).

Notable members

 Albrecht Alt (1883-1956)
 Willibald Beyschlag (1823-1900)
 Gustav Bickell (1838-1906)
 Friedrich von Bodelschwingh (1831-1910), pastor
 Harald Braun (1901-1960)
 Rolf Wilhelm Brednich (1935- )
 Friedrich Brunstäd (1883-1944)
 Theophil Friedrich Christen (1879-1920)
 Hans Conzelmann (1915-1989)
 Hermann Cremer (1834-1903)
 Friedrich Delitzsch (1850-1922)
 Konrad Duden (1829-1911), philologist and lexicographer
 Friedrich von Duhn (1851-1930)
 August Ebrard (1818-1888)
 Sigfrid Gauch (1945- )
 Franz Grashof (1826-1893)
 Adolf von Harnack (1851-1930)
 Erich Haupt (1841-1910)
 Karl Heim (1874-1958)
 Hermann Volrath Hilprecht (1859-1925)
 Emanuel Hirsch (1888-1972)
 Heinrich Holtzmann (1832-1910)
 Ferdinand Justi (1837-1907)
 Martin Kähler (1835-1912)
 Johannes Kahrs (1963- )
 Emil Kautzsch (1841-1910)
 Paul Kleinert (1837-1910)
 August Klostermann (1837-1915)
 Johannes Kuhlo (1856-1941), pastor and trombonist
 Walter Künneth (1901-1997)
 Georg Leibbrandt (1899-1982)
 Friedrich Maurer (1898-1984)
 Carl Meinhof (1857-1944)
 Christian Mergenthaler (1884-1980)
 Julius Müller (1801-1878)
 Alexander von Oettingen (1827-1905)
 Wilhelm Pauck (1901-1981)
 Friedrich Wilhelm Raiffeisen (1818-1888), social reformer and banker
 Albrecht Ritschl (1822-1889)
 Gerhard Ritter (1888-1967)
 Adolf Schlatter (1852-1938)
 Paul Schneider (1897-1939), pastor and martyr
 August Tholuck (1799-1877), evangelic theologist, oriental philologist
 Paul Tillich (1886-1965), Protestant theologian and Christian existentialist philosopher
 Jacob Volhard (1834-1910)
 Theodor Weber (1836-1906)
 Theodor Zahn (1838-1933)
 Matthias Zimmer (1961-)
 Otto Zöckler (1833-1906), theologist

Source:  Gesamtverzeichnis des Wingolf, Lichtenberg 1991

 Gottlieb Olpp (1872-1950) evangelic medical missionary

Chapters
 For more details see List of member fraternities of the Wingolf

Germany
 University of Aachen
 University of Berlin
 University of Bonn
 University of Bremen
 Clausthal University of Technology
 University of Darmstadt
 University of Erfurt
 University of Erlangen
 Johann Wolfgang Goethe University of Frankfurt am Main
 Albert Ludwigs University of Freiburg
 University of Gießen
 University of Göttingen
 University of Halle
 University of Hamburg
 University of Hannover
 University of Heidelberg
 University of Hohenheim
 University of Jena
 University of Karlsruhe
 University of Kiel
 University of Cologne
 University of Leipzig
 University of Mainz
 University of Mannheim
 University of Marburg (2 chapters)
 Ludwig Maximilian University of Munich
 University of Münster
 University of Rostock
 University of Siegen
 University of Stuttgart
 University of Tübingen
 University of Würzburg

Estonia
 University of Tartu

Austria
 Vienna

External links
 http://www.wingolf.de

Christian student societies in Germany
1844 establishments in Europe
Fraternities and sororities in Austria